Age of Heroes may refer to:

Age of Heroes (video game), released in Iran in 2009
Age of Heroes (comics), a Marvel Comics anthology limited series published in 2010
Age of Heroes (film), a 2011 British action-thriller film about the 30 Commando unit during World War II
The Greek Heroic Age